Frances Eleanore Schumann Howell (1905–1994) was a painter and teacher in Pasadena, California.  She was born in Grand Rapids, Michigan on February 5, 1905, and educated at Ohio Wesleyan University, UCLA and Columbia University (M.A., Phi Beta Kappa Society). In 1930 she married artist and educator Youldon Howell. She taught costume design for more than thirty years and among her students were Jackie Robinson and Bob Mackie.
Howell died in 1994, in Menifee, California.

In 2010, her book A History of American Dress: from the 15th and 16th century through 1965 was privately published posthumously. Howell had shelved the book in 1968, after years of delay by the publisher.

References

1905 births
1994 deaths
20th-century American painters
Artists from Grand Rapids, Michigan
Artists from Pasadena, California
Painters from California
Ohio Wesleyan University alumni
University of California, Los Angeles alumni
Columbia University alumni